Ma Hualong  (died March 2, 1871), was the fifth leader (jiaozhu) of the Jahriyya, a Sufi order (menhuan)  in northwestern China.
From the beginning of  the anti-Qing Muslim Rebellion in 1862, and until his surrender and death in 1871, he was one of the main leaders of the rebellion.

Biography
Ma Hualong became the leader of the Jahriyya ca. 1849, succeeding the menhuan'''s fourth shaykh, Ma Yide (late 1770s - 1849).
Jinjipu, a few kilometers south from today's Wuzhong City.
 The town of Jinjipu became an important religious and commercial center, and the menhuan's leaders grew wealthy thanks to the order's profitable participation in the caravan trade across Inner Mongolia, between Baotou, Huhhot and Beijing.

Since the beginning of the Muslim Rebellion in 1862, Ma Hualong was based at the Jahriyya  headquarters in Jinjipu. The area of his direct influence included the Jahriyya-heavy eastern parts of the 19th-century Gansu Province, i.e. today's Ningxia and easternmost sections of today's Gansu.
While the rebels elsewhere within the 19th-century borders of Gansu had their own leaders - notably, Ma Zhan'ao in Hezhou (now Linxia), Ma Guiyuan in Xining, and Ma Wenlu in Suzhou (Jiuquan), -who, in the view of modern historians, were acting essentially independent from each other, there were Jahriyya members (all owing allegiance to the Ma Hualong) participating in the rebellion throughout the region.

At some points during the rebellion Ma Hualong negotiated with the authorities, and at least once he even surrendered, taking a new name, "Ma Chaoqing" ("one who attends on the Qing"). However, instead of disbanding his militias, he continued fortifying Jinjipu, and collaborating with the rebels who had retreated to Gansu from Shaanxi.

Ma was besieged in Jinjipu in July 1869 by the  Qing forces led by General Zuo Zongtang. After fortifications outside of the town itself had been captured by the government troops, and starvation started inside the walls, Ma Hualong surrendered in January 1871, hoping to spare the lives of his people. However, once Zuo's troops entered Jinjipu, a massacre followed, with over a thousand people losing their lives. and the town being destroyed.

Existing accounts on Ma Hualong's death differ. It is likely that he was executed on Zuo's orders on March 2, 1871, along with his son Ma Yaobang and over eighty rebel officials  (supposedly, Zuo sentenced them to death by slicing), although it was said by some that he had been murdered by a traitor from within his own ranks.

Family and succession
Few of Ma Hualong's family survived the massacre at Jinjipu. Two his grandsons, Ma Jincheng and Ma Jinxi, were sentenced to castration upon reaching the age of 12. Ma Jincheng ended his days as a eunuch slave in Kaifeng in 1890, although the new Jahriyya leader, Ma Yuanzhang (the 1850s - 1920), managed to secretly provide him with some support until his death. The younger grandson, Ma Jinxi, was spirited away, intact, from his Xi'an confinement by Ma Yuanzhang, and was hidden at a Hui household in Hangzhou.

Zuo executed a lot of Ma's relatives, except his daughter and grandson, who was sent to Yunnan. The grandson's name was Ma Tsen-wu.

Many years later, Ma Yuanzhang managed to obtain a pardon for Ma Jinxi, and Ma Hualong's grandson returned to Ningxia. A split within the Jahriyya followed, with some members becoming followers of Ma Jinxi, and others holding for Ma Yuanzhang (who claimed descent from the order's founder Ma Mingxin, and was also related to Ma Hualong's family through his marriage).

Legacy

According to Jahriyya adherents in Ningxia, Ma Hualong's grave is in Dongta Town, which now is a suburb of Wuzhong City. Accordingly, a tomb shrine called Siqiliangzi gongbei has been established there. More than 10,000 people from all over China attended a commemoration ceremony (ermaili)  at that site in 1985.

Adherents of a rival tradition within Jahriyya, however, believe that Ma Hualong's true tomb is in Xuanhuagang, in Gansu's Zhangjiachuan County, which, coincidentally, was the base of Ma Hualong's successor, Ma Yuanzhang.

Some authors try to reconcile the two traditions, by saying that  Ma Hualong's body is in Dongta, and the head is in Zhangjiachuan.

 References 

Jonathan N. Lipman, "Ethnicity and Politics in Republican China: The Ma Family Warlords of Gansu" Modern China'', Vol. 10, No. 3 (Jul., 1984), pp. 285–316. (JSTOR)
Jonathan N. Lipman, "Familiar Strangers: A History of Muslims in Northwest China (Studies on Ethnic Groups in China)", University of Washington Press (February 1998), . (Searchable text available on Amazon.com)
 The mausoleum of Ma Hualong Photo made ca. 1936 by Claude C. Pickens. This photo, and many related photos, in the proper context, can be found by going to the Harvard University Library Visual Information Access site, and entering "Pickens" and "Ma Hualong" in the first two of the search boxes.

Notes

19th-century Chinese people
1871 deaths
Hui people
People from Wuzhong
Naqshbandi order
Chinese Sufis
Chinese Muslims
Year of birth missing